North Carlton is a former railway station that was located on the Inner Circle railway line in Melbourne, Australia. It was located on Lang Street. The station was opened on 8 May 1885, and was originally known as Langridge-street and later Lang Street. It was closed to passengers in 1948, except for special events such as the 1956 Melbourne Olympics. The station building was used a residence by the former station master and his wife, Mr and Mrs Barnes, until the mid-1970s when it was vacated upon their deaths.

The former station building is now used as North Carlton Station Neighbourhood House.

References

External links 
  North Carlton Station Neighbourhood House

Disused railway stations in Melbourne
Railway stations in Australia opened in 1885
Railway stations closed in 1948